MLB Network Radio (formerly MLB Home Plate) is an American sports talk radio station on Sirius XM Radio that features Major League Baseball related talk shows, as well as archives and live reports about MLB and such.

MLB Home Plate launched in February 2005, as an incentive to entertain the new listeners who signed up for XM's Major League Baseball deal when the games were not on. MLB Network Radio is carried on XM channel 89, and was added to the "Best of XM" package on Sirius Satellite Radio on December 10, 2008, airing on channel 209.

First season on the air
MLB Home Plate launched at the start of the Major League Baseball season in 2005, ready to entertain the new customers who bought XM to hear their favorite teams. It launched with a full lineup, and several guests immediately. On day one of broadcast, José Canseco  made the claim to his former manager turned Home Plate host Kevin Kennedy that Sammy Sosa and Mark McGwire took steroids during the 1998 Home Run Chase. XM Satellite Radio even put out a press release about the broadcast. Around launch time, XM announced that they had signed Cal Ripken Jr. to do a Saturday mid-morning show on Home Plate. The channel was aided throughout the season as XM's subscriber growth prediction exceeded what they expected, with retailers claiming that 15-17% of people who signed up for XM did it for baseball.

The end of the 2005 season was especially active as the satellite company carried both feeds of both teams during the post-season games, and four feeds per world series game (which included a promotion where XM gave out free Roady XTs to all who attended the first World Series 2005 game).

2006 - 2009
At the beginning of MLB's second season on XM Radio, XM Radio Canada decided to add all 14 MLB Play-by-Play channels to their platform. Canada already carried Home Plate, and now they would carry the complete Major League Baseball package barring XM 174 (Spanish broadcasts). In exchange, they would produce channel 179 with some select exclusive content, and make that channel the home for all the Toronto Blue Jays home games. XM Canada also produced interviews for play on the other play-by-play channels when no games were being aired.

In late April 2006, DirecTV removed the MLB Home Plate channel from their lineup. DirecTV wanted to go completely music programming. Talk channel High Voltage was also removed, but put back on the lineup within a week due to fan response. DirecTV also claims that there is a rights issue brewing over the MLB audio broadcasts, but this has been debated. On March 29, 2008, Home Plate was added to XM Radio Online.

2010 
On March 26, 2010, it was announced that MLB Home Plate will be rebranded to MLB Network Radio which will simulcast some MLB Network programs such as MLB Tonight and Hot Stove. Their programming was also changed with the rebranding.

2011 
Effective May 4, 2011, SiriusXM revamped their entire channel line up. For the first time, MLB Network Radio was moved away from the play by play to channel 89, after six years on channel 175. The Sirius channel was also changed from channel 210 to 209.

Shows
The Leadoff Spot

Weekdays 7-10 a.m. ET

Steve Phillips, CJ Nitkowski and Eduardo Perez give listeners a front row seat as a former front office executive and former player discuss and debate baseball’s headline stories, teams and players.

Power Alley

Weekdays 10 a.m. - 1 p.m. ET

Former General Manager Jim Duquette and Mike Ferrin discuss the big baseball news of the day, talk to players and executives from around baseball and take calls.

High Heat with Christopher RussoWeekdays 1-2 p.m. ET

Russo’s MLB Network Show is a fast-paced, one-hour weekday discussion on all 30 MLB clubs featuring interviews with players and club personnel. Russo will be joined by a rotating group of MLB Network analysts including Al Leiter, Bill Ripken, Dan Plesac and more.Inside Pitch

Weekdays 2-5 p.m. ET

Show hosted by Casey Stern and Brad Lidge.

Happy Hour with Casey Stern

Weekdays 5-6 p.m. ET

Casey Stern brings you an hour of no holds barred conversations with you the listeners.
Welcome to the place where the only "specials" are situational lefties.

MLB Tonight

Weeknights 6-7 p.m. and 10pm-1am. ET

Don’t miss highlights, in-game look-ins and expert analysis from Peter Gammons, Harold Reynolds, Ken Rosenthal, Dan Plesac, Bill Ripken and more.

MLB Roundtrip

Weeknights 1-6 a.m. ET

MLB Roundtrip recaps the day in baseball. Hear postgame interviews, the day's best highlights, expert analysis and talk. Hosts are Jim Memolo, veteran radio host for WGN-AM and former host of First Pitch (replaced by The Leadoff Spot), with Todd Hollandsworth (Mondays and Tuesdays) and Jeff Joyce, former host for WEEI (Wednesday, Thursday and Friday). Their co-hosts/analysts are Mike Stanton on Tuesday and Thursday, and Steve Sax on Friday.

Remember When

Saturdays 8-10 a.m. ET

Join Ed Randall and Rico Petrocelli for wide-ranging conversations on baseball's rich and fascinating history as they talk with legendary players and personalities. Take a trip with Randall and Petrocelli along the base paths and down Memory Lane when they take your calls each week.

 Loud Outs
Saturdays 10 a.m. - 1 p.m. ET

Former Major Leaguers Ryan Spilborghs and CJ Nitkowski bring their years of MLB and international experience to the airwaves every Saturday. Find out what goes on in clubhouses and dugouts around baseball with these two former players. 
Minors and Majors with Grant PaulsenSundays 8-10 a.m. ET

From the little leagues to the minor and major leagues, Paulsen reviews it all and welcomes callers of all ages.Front office

Sundays 10-1 a.m. ET

Join Jim Bowden and Jim Duquette as the former General Managers talk about the biggest issues MLB teams.

Hot Stove

Baseball offseason

Jeff Rickard, Jeff Joyce, Jim Memolo, Mike Stanton, Brad Lidge and Steve Sax track the latest free agent signings and trades.

Home Plate

Weekends following the game

The show previews the night's games, discusses the latest news and reacts to all of the weekend action.

Fill-in hosts and co-hosts/analysts
Rich Herrera, former pre- and post-game host for the Oakland Athletics, San Francisco Giants and Tampa Bay Rays. Current host on WPBB. 
Kevin Kennedy, former manager for the Texas Rangers and Boston Red Sox, former color analyst for ESPN Radio, Fox Sports and Tampa Bay Rays. Current pre- and post-game host and analyst for the Los Angeles Dodgers and part-time color analyst on radio for the Dodgers.
Matt Diaz, former MLB outfielder from 2003-2013, current pre- and post-game analyst for the Atlanta Braves.
Scott Miller, former baseball writer for CBS Sports, St. Paul Pioneer Press and Los Angeles Times. Current baseball writer for Bleacher Report and pre- and post-game analyst and insider for the San Diego Padres. 
Tyler Kepner, former baseball writer for the Seattle Post-Intelligencer and The Press-Enterprise, current baseball writer for The New York Times. 
Jody McDonald, radio host for WIP/WIP-FM in Philadelphia and WFAN in New York City, son of Joe McDonald, former General Manager for the New York Mets, St. Louis Cardinals, and Detroit Tigers. 
Jon Morosi, former baseball writer for The Boston Globe, Houston Chronicle, Detroit Free Press and Seattle Post-Intelligencer. Current baseball writer for FOX Sports. 
Daron Sutton, former play-by-play broadcaster for the Atlanta Braves, Los Angeles Angels of Anaheim, Milwaukee Brewers and Arizona Diamondbacks. Current broadcaster for Fox in multiple sports. 
Scott Braun, former anchor/host/reporter for CBS Sports, ESPN, sports writer for the University of Miami Hurricanes, play-by-play broadcaster/host/producer at WVUM, stage manager for Westwood One, ABC and YES Network, public relations for the New York Jets, host/PA announcer for the Somerset Patriots and play-by-play broadcaster for the Chatham Anglers. Current host/anchor/reporter for MLB Network on TV. 
Mel Antonen, former writer for the Argus Leader for more than 11 years and baseball writer for USA Today for 25 years. Current baseball writer for MASN and Sports Illustrated.

References

External links
 MLB Network Radio

XM Satellite Radio channels
Sirius XM Radio channels
Major League Baseball on the radio
Radio stations established in 2005
2005 establishments in North America